Jam Mir Ghulam Qadir Khan Korejo (Urdu: جام غلام قادرخان عالياني) was the 11th Jam of Lasbela who also served as the 2nd Chief Minister of Balochistan. He belonged to the Samma tribe which ruled over Sindh. His ancestor, Jam Arradin, migrated from Sindh and settled in Kanraj during the reign of Mughal emperor Jahangir.

Career 
In the 1972 Pakistani General Election, Qadir was elected for the 1st Provincial Assembly of the Balochistan, being ticket holder of Pakistan Muslim League.

Ghulam Qadir was the father of Jam Mohammad Yousaf and the grandfather of Jam Kamal Khan, both Pakistani politicians who served as Chief Ministers of Balochistan.

See also 
 Jam Mohammad Yousaf
 Jam family of Lasbela

References

External links 
 Memorandum of conditions accepted by Jam Mir Ghulam Qadir Khan. National Archives of India (1939)

1920 births
1988 deaths
Chief Ministers of Balochistan, Pakistan
Indian Knights Bachelor
Jams of Lasbela
Jamote people
Aitchison College alumni
Companions of the Order of the Indian Empire
Officers of the Order of the British Empire
People from Lasbela District
Pakistani MNAs 1962–1965
Balochistan MPAs 1985–1988
Princely rulers of Pakistan
Nawabs of Pakistan